Mariko Nicolette dela Cruz (born December 9, 1998), better known as Mika dela Cruz, is a Japanese-born Filipino actress, singer and model. She is currently an artist of GMA Network.

Personal life
Mika was born to a Filipino father and an Italian-Austrian mother. She is also the younger sister of Angelika Dela Cruz.

Career
Mika started her showbiz career with ABS-CBN Network. Mika is known for portraying teen to older characters, and is usually paired with Nash Aguas, Andre Garcia and Aaron Junatas.

On November 8, 2016, after 11 years with Star Magic, Mika officially signs with GMA Artist Center and becomes a contract artist of GMA Network.

Filmography

Television

Films

Awards and nominations

Notes

References

External links
 

1998 births
Living people
ABS-CBN personalities
Actresses from Metro Manila
Actresses from Tokyo
Filipino child actresses
Filipino film actresses
Filipino people of Austrian descent
Filipino people of Italian descent
Filipino television actresses
GMA Network personalities
People from Malabon
Star Circle Quest participants
Star Magic